Princess Daphne, formerly Ocean Monarch, Ocean Odyssey, Switzerland, Daphne, Akrotiri Express. was a medium-sized cruise ship. She had originally been the refrigerated cargo ship Port Sydney.

History

Swan, Hunter & Wigham Richardson built her in Wallsend, England as a refrigerated cargo ship for Port Line. She was launched on 29 October 1954 and completed in March 1955.

Between 1972 and 1974, she was converted into a cruise ship at Chalkis Shipyard, Piraeus, Greece.

She served as a hospital ship in Sri Lanka in 2005.

It was announced on June 14, 2014 that the Princess Daphne had arrived in Alang India under the name Daphne for scrapping, following a voyage from the Cretan port of Souda, where she was laid up in September 2012. She was given back to the Patimanios brothers by the bank following the sale of the assets of Classic International Cruises' fleet in 2013. In early 2014, rumors began to circulate saying she was to return to service under the "Classic International Cruises" banner. These rumors were proven false when it was announced that she was sold to Indian scrap merchants. She was beached at Alang, India by July 1, 2014 and scrapping commenced soon after.

References

External links

 Professional photographs from shipspotting.com
 Deck plans and cabins
  Ship details and history

1954 ships
Cargo ships of the United Kingdom
Cruise ships of Greece
Cruise ships of Panama
Cruise ships of Portugal
Passenger ships of Liberia